Chizuru Kotō (古藤千鶴, Kotō Chizuru, born Oct 8, 1982) is a Japanese volleyball player who plays for Hisamitsu Springs. She also plays for Japan women's national volleyball team as setter.

Carrier 
Kotō started her career at 7 years old due to her sister. After graduating from Nagasaki Girls' High-school, Kotō joined the PFU BlueCats which participated in the V.Challenge League in 2001.

Kotō served as a captain from 2006–7 season and won the 2008–9 V.Challenge League, where was named the Most Valuable Player. In June 2009, Kotō moved to Hisamitsu Springs.

Kotō served as a captain from 2012–3 season and won V.Premier League, so she was named for the Best6 award.

In April 2014 Kotō took part in the National team.

Private 
In August 2011 Kotō married a colleague who works in PFU Ltd.

Clubs 
 Nagayo Municipal Nagayo-kita Primary School
 Nagayo Municipal Nagayo Junior highschool
 Nagasaki Girls' Highschool
  PFU BlueCats (2001–2009)
  Hisamitsu Springs (2009–)

Awards

Individuals 
 2006-2007 V.Challenge League - Excellent Player award
 2008-2009 V.Challenge League - Most Valuable Player
 2012-2013 Premier League - Best 6 award
 2014 Asian Women's Club Volleyball Championship - Best setter

Team 
 2006-2007 V.Challenge League -  Runner-Up, with PFU BlueCats
 2008-2009 V.Challenge League -  Champion, with PFU BlueCats.
 2011-2012 V.Premier League -  Runner-Up, with Hisamitsu Springs.
 2012 Empress's Cup -  Champion, with Hisamitsu Springs.
 2012-2013 V.Premier League -  Champion, with Hisamitsu Springs.
 2013 - Japan-Korea V.League Top Match -  Champion, with Hisamitsu Springs.
 2013 - Kurowashiki All Japan Volleyball Tournament -  Champion, with Hisamitsu Springs.
 2013 - Empress's Cup -  Champion, with Hisamitsu Springs.
 2013-2014 V.Premier League -  Champion, with Hisamitsu Springs.
 2014 Asian Club Championship -  Champion, with Hisamitsu Springs.
 2014 - Empress's Cup -  Champion, with Hisamitsu Springs.
 2014-2015 V.Premier League -  Runner-Up, with Hisamitsu Springs.

National Team 
 2015 Montreux Volley Masters -  Silver medal

References

External links 
 Official Blog
 

Japanese women's volleyball players
Sportspeople from Nagasaki Prefecture
1982 births
Living people
PFU BlueCats players